Devil's Night: Dawn of the Nain Rouge is a 2019 English language feature film directed by Sam Logan Khaleghi based on the creature of the same name. The film held an advance screening at the Emagine Novi Theatre in Novi, Michigan on November 17, 2019 with a nationwide USA release of June 23, 2020 on DVD and Digital. The film mark's the debut of Eminem's younger brother Nathan Kane Mathers.

Plot 
A military veteran returns home and joins local law enforcement to tackle a string of cases involving a legendary demon.

Cast 
 Jesi Jensen as Billie Jean Finnick
 Nathan Kane Mathers as Detective Liam O'Connor
 Grover McCants as Detective Nightingale
 Sam Logan Khaleghi as Marcellus Thibeaux
 Andrew Dawe Collins as Cal
 Ammar Nemo as Detective Sammie A.
 Kenya Reynolds as Brie
 Dennis Marin as Ike Bruce
 John C. Forman as Pastor Wilhem 
 Judy Stepanian as Anna Lee
 Jerry Narsh as Chief Romano 
 Napoleon Duraisamy as the museum curator
 Swifty McVay as the Mayor of Detroit

Production 
The film began production when director Sam Logan Khaleghi expressed interest in making a film based on Nain Rouge, a mythical creature of a lore which is popular in Detroit. Shooting started in 2018 in Detroit and Lake Orion, Michigan; featuring prominent Detroit locations such as the historic Packard Automotive Plant, Fisher Auto, the Michigan Central Station, the Renaissance Center station, and the Detroit Historical Museum. This film marks the acting debut of Eminem's younger brother, Nathan Kane Mathers. Former, actual Lake Orion Police Chief Jerry Narsh appears in the film, alongside Oakland County Sheriff Mike Bouchard and Fox News 2 anchors Jay Towers & Amy Andrews. Platinum recording artist Swifty McVay, of the hip hop group D12, played the role of the mayor of Detroit and composed the song “Scariest Thing" for the film.

Soundtrack

Devil's Night: Dawn of the Nain Rouge (Original Motion Picture Soundtrack) was released on October 30, 2019 via Kyyba Films. Composed of six song, the extended play featured contributions from Swifty McVay, 80 Empire, Kuniva, Lazarus and Obie Trice with production handled by Dub Muzik, LaidBackz and the ATG. The album spawned three singles: "Scariest Thing" and "Phoney" with both music videos directed by Sam Logan Khaleghi, and "Strong Enough".

Track listing

References 

2019 films
Demons in film
Films shot in Detroit
Films shot in Michigan
American independent films
2019 horror thriller films
American horror thriller films
2010s English-language films
2010s American films